Omar Abu-Riche (10 April 1910 – 15 July 1990) was an influential Syrian poet known for his pioneering works.

Biography 
Abu-Riche was born into a wealthy literary family in Manbij, near Aleppo. He received his educational upbringing in Syria and continued his tertiary studies at the University of Damascus. He also studied at the American University in Beirut in 1931 and later read chemistry at the University of Manchester but returned to Syria in 1932. While initially a fan of Abbasid poetry, he later looked for more independent voices in poetry and considered Shakespeare's Venus and Adonis to be the greatest love poem ever written. His favorite poets were Charles Baudelaire and Edgar Allan Poe. 

He wrote the poem, "Khatam-ul-Hub" (The End of Love) and produced literary works and attended to his duties as Librarian of Aleppo, Syria. In 1949, the Syrian government appointed him ambassador to Brazil. As a diplomat until 1964, he was ambassador to Argentina, Chile, India, Austria, and finally the United States.

His works included several volumes of poetry and poetic dramas.

References

Further reading
Hafez, Sabry. (19 July 1990). "Obituary: Omar Abu-Riche". The Independent (London), p. 31.

1910 births
1990 deaths
People from Manbij District
Syrian poets
Ambassadors of Syria to Brazil
Ambassadors of Syria to Chile
Ambassadors of Syria to India
Ambassadors of Syria to Austria
Ambassadors of Syria to the United States
American University of Beirut alumni
Alumni of the Victoria University of Manchester
20th-century poets
Syrian expatriates in the United Kingdom